Redundancy in United Kingdom law concerns the rights of employees if they are dismissed for economic reasons in UK labour law.

Definition of redundancy
Section 139 of the Employment Rights Act 1996 defines the two situations in which a redundancy may occur:

(a) the fact that his employer has ceased or intends to cease—

(i) to carry on the business for the purposes of which the employee was employed by him, or

(ii) to carry on that business in the place where the employee was so employed, or

(b) the fact that the requirements of that business—

(i) for employees to carry out work of a particular kind, or

(ii) for employees to carry out work of a particular kind in the place where the employee was employed by the employer,

have ceased or diminished or are expected to cease or diminish.

Diminishing of work
While the first case envisages situations where an employer simply closes his business, the second scenario has caused trouble in its interpretation. 
Safeway Stores plc v Burrell
Church v West Lancashire NHS Trust

The function of the employee
The function of the employee
Johnson v Nottinghamshire Combined Police Authority
Murphy v Epsom College

The place of work
Geographical test now favoured, Bass Leisure Ltd v Thomas, best of both worlds for the employer potentially, though in that case the EAT made clear that any use of mobility clauses must be subject to the employee's situation.

Redundancy procedure
Bessenden Properties Ltd v Corness establishes the main principles on fairness of procedure, with Williams v Compair Maxam Ltd affirming it.

Consultation
 Huddersfield Parcels Ltd v Sykes on double consultation (Dyke v Hereford and Worcester County Council affirming)
 Trade Union and Labour Relations (Consolidation) Act 1992, Section 188
 special circumstances defence

Selection criteria
 British Aerospace Plc v Green and FDR Ltd v Holloway on discovery of how criteria were applied
 Clarke v Eley Kynoch Ltd on discrimination in criteria on gender

Re-organisations and redundancy

Redundancy payments
Redundancy payments are defined in law.

In 2002, the Court of Appeal ruled in a case brought by staff employed at Albion's Farington site in Lancashire, Albion Automotive Ltd w. Walker and others, that a contractual term entitling employees to an enhanced redundancy payment could be implied into the employees' contracts of employment based on the employer's custom and practice.

However, in a different 2002 decision in the Employment Appeal Tribunal, Warman International v Wilson, Mr Wilson's claim of being entitled to an enhanced redundancy payment, supported by the Employment Tribunal meeting in Leeds in 2000, was overturned because previous enhanced levels of redundancy payment had on each occasion been made on a case-by-case decision and the employer, when making comparator payments to other staff made redundant, had specifically asserted that enhanced payments for some staff created no precedent on which other staff could subsequently rely.

See also
UK labour law
Layoff

References

English civil law
Termination of employment
Employment compensation
United Kingdom labour law